Clément Keerstock (born 12 October 1902, date of death unknown) was a Belgian footballer. He played in three matches for the Belgium national football team in 1927.

References

External links
 

1902 births
Year of death missing
Belgian footballers
Belgium international footballers
Place of birth missing
Association footballers not categorized by position